Nemanja Radoja (born 6 February 1993) is a Serbian professional footballer who plays as a defensive midfielder for Sporting Kansas City.

Club career

Vojvodina
Born in Novi Sad, Radoja grew up in neighboring Veternik, and graduated from Vojvodina's youth setup. Following the footsteps of his older brother Stefan, he started training football. Radoja was promoted to the main squad in the summer of 2011 but was subsequently loaned to third-tier ČSK Čelarevo. He signed a new five-year professional deal with the Vojvodina on 8 March 2012, being subsequently loaned to fellow third division side Cement Beočin.

Radoja played his first match as a professional on 18 August 2012, coming on as a late substitute in a 1–0 away win against Spartak. He scored his first professional goal on 17 April 2013, netting his side's only in a Serbian Cup semifinal 1–1 draw against OFK Beograd (2–1 on aggregate), thus taking Vojvodina to the finals.

Radoja played regularly for Voša in the 2012–13 campaign, appearing in 22 matches (16 starts, 1553 minutes of action) and helping his side to finish in the third position. He maintained his starting place in the following season, appearing in 25 matches, also being selected in the league's best XI.

Celta
In August 2014. Radoja signed a five-year deal with La Liga side Celta de Vigo. He made his debut for the club on 24 August, playing the last three minutes in a 3–1 home win over Getafe.

Radoja made no appearances during the entire 2018–19 season, after he expressed his desire to play in the Premier League and refused a contract renewal from Celta.

Levante
On 21 August 2019, free agent Radoja agreed to a three-year contract with Levante, still in the Spanish top tier.

International career
Radoja appeared for under-18 and under-19 squads. He was a member of under-19's at the 2012 UEFA European Under-19 Football Championship, appearing regularly.

Radoja got his first call up to the senior Serbia side for 2018 FIFA World Cup qualifiers against Moldova and Austria in October 2016. He made his debut in a friendly match against Ukraine on 15 November 2016.

Career statistics

Club

International

Honours
Vojvodina
 Serbian Cup: 2013–14

Individual
 Serbian SuperLiga Team of the Season: 2013–14

References

External links

Stats and bio at Utakmica.rs 

1993 births
Living people
Footballers from Novi Sad
Serbian footballers
Association football defenders
Association football midfielders
Association football utility players
Serbian SuperLiga players
FK Vojvodina players
FK Cement Beočin players
La Liga players
RC Celta de Vigo players
Levante UD footballers
Sporting Kansas City players
Serbian expatriate footballers
Serbian expatriate sportspeople in Spain
Expatriate footballers in Spain
Major League Soccer players
Serbia youth international footballers
Serbia under-21 international footballers
Serbia international footballers